The 2009 Armenian Cup was the 18th season of Armenian knockout football competition. It featured only 8 Premier League teams. The tournament started on 17 March 2009 and ended on 9 May 2009. The defending champions were Ararat Yerevan.

Results

Quarter-finals
The first legs were played on 17 and 18 March 2009. The second legs were played on 7 and 8 April 2009.

|}

Semi-finals
The first legs were played on 14 and 15 April 2009. The second legs were played on 21 and 22 April 2009.

|}

Final

See also
 2009 Armenian Premier League
 2009 Armenian First League

External links
  Official site
 Armenia Cup 2009 at Soccerway.com
 Armenia Cup 2009 at rsssf.com

2009
Armenian Cup
Cup